The Federal University of Western Bahia (UFOB) is a public university located in the cities of Barreiras, Barra, Bom Jesus da Lapa, Santa Maria da Vitória and Luiz Eduardo Magalhães, Brazil.

External links 

 

Universities and colleges in Bahia
Bahia
Uberaba
Educational institutions established in 2011
2011 establishments in Brazil